Wakehurst, previously known as Wakehurst Place, is a house and botanic gardens in West Sussex, England, owned by the National Trust but used and managed by the Royal Botanic Gardens, Kew. It is near Ardingly, West Sussex in the High Weald (grid reference TQ340315), and comprises a late 16th-century mansion, a mainly 20th-century garden and, in a modern building, Kew's Millennium Seed Bank. Visitors are able to see the gardens, the Mansion, and also visit the seed bank.

RBG Kew has leased the land from the National Trust since 1965 and much has been achieved in this time, from the Millennium Seed Bank project and the creation of the Loder Valley and Francis Rose Nature Reserves to the introduction of the visitor centre, the Seed café and Stables restaurant along with the development of the gardens.

Wakehurst is listed Grade I on the National Heritage List for England, and its gardens are listed Grade II* on the Register of Historic Parks and Gardens.

The stables are listed Grade II* and the South Lodge and gateway is listed Grade II.

History
The mansion was built by Sir Edward Culpeper in 1590. It originally formed a complete courtyard prior to being altered various times, and currently has an E-shaped plan. Wakehurst was bought in 1694 by Dennis Lyddell, comptroller of the Royal Navy treasurer's accounts and briefly MP for Harwich. His son Richard Liddell, Chief Secretary for Ireland and MP for Bossiney, was obliged by financial pressure to pass the estate to his younger brother Charles.

The house was illustrated in  Joseph Nash's The Mansions of England in the Olden Time (1839–49).

The gardens were largely created by Gerald Loder (later Lord Wakehurst) who purchased the estate in 1903 and spent 33 years developing the gardens.  He was succeeded by Sir Henry Price, under whose care the Loder plantings matured. Sir Henry left Wakehurst to the nation in 1963 and the Royal Botanic Gardens took up a lease from the National Trust in 1965.

In 1887, American architect Dudley Newton completed a replica of Wakehurst in Newport, Rhode Island, for sportsman and politician James J. Van Alen from plans designed by Charles Eamer Kempe. Salve Regina University purchased the mansion from the Van Alen family in 1972.

In 2022, the mansion was closed for an extensive renovation, predicted to last at least two years.

National Collections
Wakehurst is home to the National Collections of Betula (birches), Hypericum, Nothofagus (Southern Hemisphere beeches) and Skimmia. The Great Storm of 1987 decimated Loder's plantings, toppling 20,000 trees. Since then, Kew has redesigned the gardens to create a walk through the temperate woodlands of the world.

Millennium Seed Bank
The Wellcome Trust Millennium Building, which houses an international seed bank known as the Millennium Seed Bank (run by Kew, not the National Trust), was opened in 2000. The aim of the Millennium Seed Bank is to collect seeds from all of the UK's native flora and conserve seeds from 25% of the world's flora by 2020, in the hope that this will save species from extinction in the wild.

Nearby, also cared for by Kew, are the Loder Valley Nature Reserve of woodland, meadowland and wetland habitats, and the Francis Rose Reserve, the first devoted to cryptogams (mosses, lichens and ferns).

Christmas tree
Wakehurst is home to the largest growing Christmas tree in England, a giant redwood. The lightbulbs on the tree were changed in 2006 to energy-saving lightbulbs, so the tree is not as bright as before but uses less energy.

Popular culture
Much of Kenneth Branagh's 2006 film As You Like It, adapted from Shakespeare's play, was filmed on location at Wakehurst.

On 4 June 2021, the BBC broadcast an episode of Gardeners' World from Wakehurst.

See also
Kew Gardens
Listed buildings in England
Tudor architecture

References

External links

Wakehurst: National Trust
Wakehurst: Royal Botanic Gardens, Kew
Visit Wakehurst 
What's on at Wakehurst

1590 establishments in England
Ardingly
Botanical gardens in England
Country houses in West Sussex
Gardens in West Sussex
Grade I listed houses
Grade II listed buildings in West Sussex
Grade II* listed buildings in West Sussex
Grade II* listed parks and gardens in West Sussex
Houses completed in 1590
National Trust properties in West Sussex
Royal Botanic Gardens, Kew
Tourist attractions in West Sussex
Tudor architecture
Woodland gardens